James H. Speer (born 1971) is a professor of geography and geology at Indiana State University. He is a past president of the Tree-Ring Society and the Geography Educator's Network of Indiana. He has been the organizer for the North American Dendroecological Fieldweek (NADEF) since 2003.

Education 

Speer received his bachelor's and master's degree in geosciences from the University of Arizona and his PhD from the University of Tennessee in geography.

Recognition 
He received the Henry Cowles award from the American Association of Geographers (with Thomas W. Swetnam) for their paper on Pandora moth outbreaks in 2002. In 2008, he received the Richard L. Holmes Outstanding Service to Dendrochronology award from the Tree-Ring Society. He received the William E. Bennett Award for Extraordinary Contributions to Citizen Science from the National Center for Science and Civic Engagement in 2011. He received the Henry Cowles award from the American Association of Geographers a second time for his book Fundamentals of Tree-Ring Research published with the University of Arizona Press. He received the Dreiser Distinguished Research/Creativity Award at Indiana State University in 2017.

Research 

He has authored and co-authored more than 40 scientific papers. His most cited papers are:

References 
 James H. Speer faculty profile
 James H. Speer homepage
 Google Scholar Profile
 Researchgate Profile
 Academia.edu Profile
 Tree-Ring Society
 Fundamentals of Tree-Ring Research
 National Center for Science and Civic Engagement
 North American Dendroecological Fieldweek (NADEF)
 Speer et al. 2004
 Speer et al. 2009
 Clark et al. 2017

Living people
University of Tennessee alumni
University of Arizona alumni
Indiana State University faculty
1971 births